Bluefield Downtown Commercial Historic District is a national historic district  located at Bluefield, Mercer County, West Virginia.  The district includes 73 contributing buildings in Bluefield's central business district.  The buildings are primarily three and four story masonry commercial buildings. Notable buildings include The Shamrock Restaurant (1885), People's Bank (1895), the Art Deco / Moderne style Colonial Theatre (1916, c. 1945) and Appalachian Power Company building (1923, 1939), Law and Commerce Building (1913, 1918), Benevolent Protective Order of Elks Building (1902, 1927), First Christian Church (1920), Elizabeth Kee Federal Building and Post Office (1911), Bluefield Sanatorium, and West Virginia Hotel (1923) designed by Alex B. Mahood. Located in the district is the separately listed Municipal Building.

It was listed on the National Register of Historic Places in 1987.

References

Art Deco architecture in West Virginia
Historic districts in Bluefield, West Virginia
Moderne architecture in West Virginia
National Register of Historic Places in Mercer County, West Virginia
Renaissance Revival architecture in West Virginia
Historic districts on the National Register of Historic Places in West Virginia